Lacinutrix salivirga is a Gram-negative, strictly aerobic, rod-shaped and motile bacterium from the genus of Lacinutrix which has been isolated from seawater from Korea.

References 

Flavobacteria
Bacteria described in 2020